The Best of Rod Stewart may refer to:

The Best of Rod Stewart (1976 album)
The Best of Rod Stewart (1989 album)